The Tournoi de France (French, 'Tournament of France') was a friendly international football tournament held in France in early February 1988. Four national teams participated in the competition: Austria, Morocco, hosts France, and Switzerland.

It was a knockout tournament played over three days in Toulouse and Monaco. The final and third-place play-off were held in Monaco, which is a country independent of France.

Results

Semi-finals

Third place play-off

Final

Statistics

Goalscorers

See also
 Tournoi de France
 1997 Tournoi de France

External links 
 RSSSF

1988
1987–88 in French football
1987–88 in Swiss football
1987–88 in Austrian football
1987–88 in Moroccan football
February 1988 sports events in Europe
International men's association football invitational tournaments